Nigel Newton  (born 16 June 1955) is an American-born British publisher. He is the founder and chief executive (CEO) of Bloomsbury Publishing.

Early life
Nigel Newton was born on 16 June 1955 in San Francisco, California. He was born to an American mother and an English father. His father, Peter Newton, was a Napa Valley winemaker, the founder of Sterling Vineyards and Newton Vineyard.

Newton earned a degree in English from Selwyn College, Cambridge.

Career
Newton began his career as assistant to the sales director at Macmillan. He later worked for Sidgwick and Jackson.

Newton conceived the idea of Bloomsbury in 1984 and the name of the company shortly thereafter; he first approached David Reynolds to join him in 1985 and later they brought on board Liz Calder and Alan Wherry. The four of them launched the company together in 1986.

In 2020, Newton received the London Book Fair Lifetime Achievement Award.

He was appointed Commander of the Order of the British Empire (CBE) in the 2021 New Year Honours for services to the publishing industry.

Personal life
Newton is married to Joanna, they have three children, Catherine, Alice and William, and live in London and East Sussex.

References  

1955 births
Living people
Alumni of Selwyn College, Cambridge
American emigrants to England
American people of English descent
British book publishers (people)
Commanders of the Order of the British Empire
Deerfield Academy alumni
People from San Francisco